Cutaneous group B streptococcal infection may result in orbital cellulitis or facial erysipelas in neonates.

See also 
 Skin lesion

References 

Bacterium-related cutaneous conditions
Streptococcal infections